Michael W. Smith Project is the debut album of Christian recording artist Michael W. Smith. Originally released in 1983, the album was reissued in CD format in 1987 with a new cover featuring an updated photo of Smith. The album reached number nine on the Top Contemporary Christian chart.CCM Magazine ranked Michael W. Smith Project at number 34 on their 2001 book CCM Presents: The 100 Greatest Albums in Christian Music. Smith earned his first Grammy nomination for Best Gospel Performance, Male at the 26th Grammy Awards.

Track listing 

Note:  "First Light" was titled "From Light" on the original vinyl and cassette releases.

Personnel 
 Michael W. Smith – lead vocals, backing vocals, acoustic piano, Fender Rhodes, Yamaha GS2, Prophet-5 synthesizers
 Shane Keister – Oberheim OB-X, Prophet-5 synthesizers, vocoder
 Jon Goin – guitars
 Mike Brignardello – bass
 Mark Hammond – drums, Roland TR-808 drum machine on "First Light"
 Mike Psanos – percussion
 Denis Solee – saxophone
 Gary Chapman – backing vocals
 Jackie Cusic – backing vocals
 Diana DeWitt – backing vocals
 David Durham – backing vocals
 Teresa Ellis – backing vocals
 Amy Grant – backing vocals on "Friends"
 Pam Mark Hall – backing vocals
 Chris Harris – backing vocals
 Gary Pigg – backing vocals
 Kim Smith – backing vocals

Production 
 Michael W. Smith – producer, assistant engineer
 Michael Blanton – executive producer
 Dan Harrell – executive producer
 Mike Psanos – engineer
 Brown Bannister – assistant engineer
 John Woods – assistant engineer
 Jack Joseph Puig – remixing
 Recorded at Tree International Studio (Nashville, Tennessee).
 Hank Williams – mastering
 Mastered at Woodland Sound Studio (Nashville, Tennessee).
 Bill Brunt – art direction
 Tim Campbell – photography

Chart performance

References 

Michael W. Smith albums
1983 debut albums
Reunion Records albums